WVOW is a Full Service formatted broadcast radio station licensed to Logan, West Virginia, serving Logan and Logan County, West Virginia.  WVOW is owned and operated by Logan Broadcasting Corporation.

References

External links
 WVOW Radio Online

1954 establishments in West Virginia
Full service radio stations in the United States
Radio stations established in 1954
VOW